Full general elections were held in Belgium on 14 October 1894, with run-off elections held on 21 October 1894.

The elections followed several major reforms: they were the first held under universal male suffrage for those over the age of 25. This followed the abolition of tax qualifications, and increased the number of voters tenfold. Voting was also made compulsory. Provincial senators were introduced in addition to the existing directly elected ones.

The electoral reforms were implemented in 1893 under the Catholic government led by Auguste Beernaert, who had been in power for nearly ten years, but who resigned because his proposal for proportional representation was rejected. A government led by Jules de Burlet took over in March 1894.

The result was a victory for the Catholic Party, which won all seats in every Flemish arrondissement, in Brussels and in seven rural Walloon arrondissements, giving a total of 104 of the 152 seats in the Chamber of Representatives. The Belgian Labour Party gained parliamentary representation for the first time, winning all seats of Mons, Soignies, Charleroi, Verviers, 6 seats in Liège and one in Namur. Meanwhile, the Liberal Party, despite receiving more votes than the socialists, won only 20 seats and thus lost two-thirds of its seats. This was caused by the concentration of socialists in industrial Walloon areas, compared to the dispersed presence of liberal voters throughout the country. This highlighted the need for a proportional system, which would eventually be introduced in 1899.

Results

Chamber of Representatives

Senate
76 senators (half the number of representatives) were directly elected and 26 senators were chosen by the provincial councils, giving a total of 102 senators.

Constituencies
The distribution of seats among the electoral districts was as follows for the Chamber of Representatives and the Senate. There were no changes in districts and seat distribution compared to the previous election, except for the introduction of provincial senators.

References

Belgium
1890s elections in Belgium
General
Belgium